The Taylor rule is a monetary policy targeting rule. The rule was proposed in 1992 by American economist John B. Taylor for central banks to use to stabilize economic activity by appropriately setting short-term interest rates.

The rule considers the federal funds rate, the price level and changes in real income. The Taylor rule computes the optimal federal funds rate based on the gap between the desired (targeted) inflation rate and the actual inflation rate; and the output gap between the actual and natural output level. According to Taylor, monetary policy is stabilizing when the nominal interest rate is higher/lower than the increase/decrease in inflation. Thus the Taylor rule prescribes a relatively high interest rate when actual inflation is higher than the inflation target.

In the United States, the Federal Open Market Committee controls monetary policy. The committee attempts to achieve an average inflation rate of 2% (with an equal likelihood of higher or lower inflation).

The main advantage of a general targeting rule is that a central bank gains the discretion to apply multiple means to achieve the set target.

The monetary policy of the Federal Reserve changed throughout the 20th century. The period between the 1960s and the 1970s is evaluated by Taylor and others as a period of poor monetary policy; the later years typically characterized as stagflation. The inflation rate was high and increasing, while interest rates were kept low. Since the mid-1970s monetary targets have been used in many countries as a means to target inflation. However, in the 2000s the actual interest rate in advanced economies, notably in the US, was kept below the value suggested by the Taylor rule.

The Taylor rule is typically contrasted with discretionary monetary policy, which relies on the personal views of the monetary policy authorities. The Taylor rule often faces criticism due to its complexity, the inaccuracy of the exogenous variables, and the limited number of factors it considers.

Equation
According to Taylor's original version of the rule, the real policy interest rate should respond to divergences of actual inflation rates  from target inflation rates and of actual Gross Domestic Product (GDP) from potential GDP:

The  approximation is used here.

 
In this equation, both  and  should be positive (as a rough rule of thumb, Taylor's 1993 paper proposed setting ).  That is, the rule produces a relatively high real interest rate (a "tight" monetary policy) when inflation is above its target or when output is above its full-employment level, in order to reduce inflationary pressure.  It recommends a relatively low real interest rate ("easy" monetary policy) in the opposite situation, to stimulate output.  Sometimes monetary policy goals may conflict, as in the case of stagflation, when inflation is above its target with a substantial output gap. In such a situation, a Taylor rule specifies the relative weights given to reducing inflation versus increasing output.

Principle
Since the real interest rate is (approximately) the nominal interest rate minus inflation, stipulating  implies that when inflation rises, the real interest rate should be increased. The idea that the nominal interest rate should be raised "more than one-for-one" to cool the economy when inflation increases (that is increasing the real interest rate) has been called the Taylor principle. The Taylor principle presumes a unique bounded equilibrium for inflation. If the Taylor principle is violated, then the inflation path may be unstable.

History 
The concept of a policy rule emerged as part of the discussion on whether monetary policy should be based on intuition/discretion. The discourse began at the beginning of the 19th century. The first formal debate forum was launched in the 1920s by the US House Committee on Banking and Currency. In the hearing on the so-called Strong bill in 1923. the conflict in the views on the monetary policy clearly appeared. New York Fed Governor Benjamin Strong Jr., supported by Professors John R. Commons and Irving Fisher, was concerned about the Fed's practices that attempted to ensure price stability. In his opinion, Federal Reserve policy regarding the price level could not guarantee long-term stability. After the death of the congressman, a political debate on changing the Fed's policy was suspended. The Fed was dominated at that time by Strong and his New York Reserve Bank.

After the Great Depression hit the country, policies came under debate. Irving Fisher opined, "this depression was almost wholly preventable and that it would have been prevented if Governor Strong had lived, who was conducting open-market operations with a view of bringing about stability". Later on, monetarists such as Milton Friedman and Anna Schwartz agreed that high inflation could be avoided if the Fed managed the quantity of money more consistently.

The 1960s recession in the US was accompanied by relatively high interest rates. After the Bretton Woods agreement collapsed, policymakers focused on keeping interest rates low, which yielded the Great Inflation of 1970.

Since the mid-1970s money supply targets have been used in many countries to address inflation targets. Many advanced economies, such as the US and the UK, made their policy rates broadly consistent with the Taylor rule in the period of the Great Moderation between the mid-1980s and early 2000s. That period was characterized by limited inflation/stable prices. New Zealand went first, adopting an inflation target in 1990. The Reserve Bank of New Zealand was reformed to prioritize price stability, gaining more independence at the same time. The Bank of Canada (1991) and by 1994 the banks of Sweden, Finland, Australia, Spain, Israel and Chile were given the mandate to target inflation.

Since the 2000s began the actual interest rate in advanced economies, especially in the US, was below that suggested by the Taylor rule. The deviation can be explained by the fact that central banks were supposed to mitigate the outcomes of financial busts, while intervening only given inflation expectations. Economic shocks were accompanied by lower rates.

Alternative versions

While the Taylor principle has proven influential, debate remains about what else the rule should incorporate. According to some New Keynesian macroeconomic models, insofar as the central bank keeps inflation stable, the degree of fluctuation in output will be optimized (economists Olivier Blanchard and Jordi Gali call this property the 'divine coincidence'). In this case, the central bank does not need to take fluctuations in the output gap into account when setting interest rates (that is, it may optimally set .)

Other economists proposed adding terms to the Taylor rule to take into account financial conditions: for example, the interest rate might be raised when stock prices, housing prices, or interest rate spreads increase. Taylor offered a modified rule in 1999: that specfieid .

Alternative theories 
The solvency rule was presented by Emiliano Brancaccio after the 2008 financial crisis. The  banker follows a rule aimed to control the economy's solvency . The inflation target and output gap are neglected, while the interest rate is conditional upon the solvency of workers and firms. The solvency rule was presented more as a benchmark than a mechanistic formula.

The McCallum rule:was offered by economist Bennett T. McCallum at the end of the 20th-century. It targets the nominal gross domestic product. He proposed that the Fed stabilize nominal GDP. The McCallum rule uses precise financial data. Thus, it can overcome the problem of unobservable variables.

Market monetarism extended the idea of NGDP targeting to include level targeting. (targeting a specific amount of growth per time period, and accelerating/decelerating growth to compensate for prior periods of weakness/strength). It also introduced the concept of targeting the forecast, such that policy is set to achieve the goal rather than merely to lean in one direction or the other. One proposed mechanism for assessing the impact of policy was to establish an NGDP futures market and use it to draw upon the insights of that market to direct policy.

Empirical relevance
Although the Federal Reserve does not follow the Taylor rule, many analysts have argued that it provides a fairly accurate explanation of US monetary policy under Paul Volcker and Alan Greenspan and other developed economies. This observation has been cited by Clarida, Galí, and Gertler as a reason why inflation had remained under control and the economy had been relatively stable in most developed countries from the 1980s through the 2000s. However, according to Taylor, the rule was not followed in part of the 2000s, possibly inflating the housing bubble. Some research has reported that households form expectations about the future path of interest rates, inflation, and unemployment in a way that is consistent with Taylor-type rules.

Limitations 
The Taylor rule is debated in the discourse of the rules vs. discretion. Limitations of the Taylor rule include.

 The 4 month period typically used is not accurate for tracking price changes, and is too long for setting interest rates. 
 The formula incorporates unobservable parameters that can be easily misevaluated. For example, the output-gap cannot be precisely estimated.
 Forecasted variables such as the inflation and output gaps, are not accurate, depending on different scenarios of economic development.
 Difficult to assess the state of the economy early enough to adjust policy.
 The discretionary optimization that leads to stabilization bias and a lack of history dependence.
 The rule does not consider financial parameters. 
 The rule not consider other policy instruments such as reserve funds adjustment or balance sheet policies.
 The relationship between the interest rate and aggregate demand.

Taylor highlighted that the rule should not be followed blindly: "…There will be episodes where monetary policy will need to be adjusted to deal with special factors."

Criticisms
Athanasios Orphanides (2003) claimed that the Taylor rule can mislead policy makers who face real-time data. He claimed that the Taylor rule matches the US funds rate less perfectly when accounting for informational limitations and that an activist policy following the Taylor rule would have resulted in inferior macroeconomic performance during the 1970s.

In 2015, bond king Bill Gross said the Taylor rule "must now be discarded into the trash bin of history", in light of tepid GDP growth in the years after 2009. Gross believed that low interest rates were not the cure for decreased growth, but the source of the problem.

See also
Monetary policy
Monetary policy reaction function
McCallum rule
Fisher effect
Market monetarism
Inflation targeting

References

External links
Resources from John Taylor's web site.
Federal Reserve paper on the Taylor Rule.

Federal Reserve System
Monetary policy
Monetary economics